The 22629 / 30 Dadar Terminus - Tirunelveli Junction Superfast Express is a Superfast express train belonging to Indian Railways Southern Zone that runs between Dadar Terminus and  in India.

Coaches

The 22629 / 30 Dadar Terminus - Tirunelveli Junction Superfast Express has one AC 2-tier, two AC 3-tier, 7 sleeper class, three general unreserved & two EOG (Luggage, Brake and Generator car) coaches. It does not carry a pantry car coach.

As is customary with most train services in India, coach composition may be amended at the discretion of Indian Railways depending on demand.

LHB rake is using for the service from 11 July 2018 onwards.

Service

As the average speed of the train is above , as per railway rules, its fare includes a Superfast surcharge.

Routing

Traction
As the route is going to electrification, an Erode based WDM-3D or Golden Rock (Ponmalai) WDP-4D diesel locomotive pulls the train from Dadar Central to Mangalore Junction handing over to Electric Loco Shed, Royapuram or Electric Loco Shed, Erode based WAP-7 towards the remaining part of the journey till Tirunelveli Junction.

Timetable 

22630 - Leaves Tirunelveli Junction at morning 7:15 AM every Wednesday and reach Dadar Station on Thursday evening 16:40 hrs IST

22629 - leaves Dadar Station every Thursday at 20:40 Hrs IST and reach Tirunelveli Junction at Saturday Morning at 9:45 AM

References

External links
22629 Dadar - Tirunelveli Express at India Rail Info
22630 Tirunelveli - Dadar Express at India Rail Info

Express trains in India
Transport in Mumbai
Rail transport in Maharashtra
Rail transport in Goa
Rail transport in Karnataka
Rail transport in Kerala
Rail transport in Tamil Nadu
Transport in Tirunelveli
Konkan Railway